Adriano Ferreira Martins or simply Adriano (born January 21, 1982), is a Brazilian football striker for Portuguesa-RJ.

Club career
Born in São Paulo (SP), Adriano started his career at Itararé-SP in 2002, after having played for the youth team's of Santa Cruz and Osasco-SP. In the following year he was signed by ADAP, and was later loaned out to Treze (2003), Botafogo-PB (2004) and Arapongas (2005, where he began to gain prominence to be one of the top scorers of the Segunda Divisão Paranaense with 11 goals.

In June 2011, Adriano left Gamba Osaka and joined Qatari club El Jaish, signing a three-year contract with the club. In his first season with El Jaish, Adriano finished as the top scorer in the Qatar Stars League with 18 goals in 20 games.

Adriano expressed interest in playing for the Qatar national team, however he would have to wait until 2014 to be naturalized.

In June 2018, Adriano joined Barra da Tijuca. However, a serious injury prevented him from playing any games for the club. He was then without club until December 2019, where he joined Portuguesa da Ilha.

Honours
 Top scorer of the 2011–12 Qatar Stars League with 18 goals

Club statistics

External links

  CBF
  sambafoot
  zerozero.pt
  globoesporte.globo.com
  Guardian Stats Centre
  internacional.com.br

References

1982 births
Living people
Footballers from São Paulo
Brazilian footballers
Brazilian expatriate footballers
Brazilian expatriate sportspeople in Spain
Expatriate footballers in Spain
Brazilian expatriate sportspeople in Japan
Expatriate footballers in Japan
Brazilian expatriate sportspeople in Qatar
Expatriate footballers in Qatar
Campeonato Brasileiro Série A players
Campeonato Brasileiro Série B players
Campeonato Brasileiro Série C players
La Liga players
J1 League players
Qatar Stars League players
Santa Cruz Futebol Clube players
Osasco Futebol Clube players
Botafogo Futebol Clube (PB) players
Associação Desportiva Atlética do Paraná players
Treze Futebol Clube players
Sport Club Internacional players
Málaga CF players
CR Vasco da Gama players
Cerezo Osaka players
Gamba Osaka players
El Jaish SC players
Qatar SC players
Tokushima Vortis players
Ventforet Kofu players
Fortaleza Esporte Clube players
Nova Iguaçu Futebol Clube players
Volta Redonda FC players
Associação Atlética Portuguesa (RJ) players
Association football forwards